Saint-Didier-de-Formans (literally Saint-Didier of Formans) is a commune in the Ain department in eastern France.

Population

Personalities
The historian Marc Bloch (1886-1944) was executed by the Gestapo here.

See also
Communes of the Ain department

References

Communes of Ain
Ain communes articles needing translation from French Wikipedia